Scarab (stylized as S.C.A.R.A.B.) is a video game developed and published by Electronic Arts for Windows.

Gameplay
Scarab is a game that takes place in ancient Egypt, except that the gods use mechanized soldiers in their wars against one other. The game combines elements of shooters and strategy games, where each side can win by either defeating all opponents, or by placing and keeping the largest amount of towers around the map within a specific amount of time.

Reception
Next Generation reviewed the PC version of the game, rating it three stars out of five, and stated that "Although the missions vary a bit, they mostly stay within the same vein – kill or be killed. If you're playing alone, there are other, better titles with similar gameplay, but playing with a few friends over a LAN or on the Net, Scarab ain't bad at all."

Reviews
Computer Games Magazine - 1997
GameSpot - April 30, 1997
PC Player - June 1997
PC Games - May 1997
CD-Action Jun 1997
Game-Over! Jul 1997

References

1997 video games
Electronic Arts games
First-person shooters
Video games based on Egyptian mythology
Video games developed in the United States
Video games set in Egypt
Windows games
Windows-only games